GTV Network HD is a Pakistani news media group based in Karachi Pakistan. Network owns Urdu news channel GTV News, which was launched on August 30, 2018. Mukhtar Abbas is chairman of GTV Network.

GTV Programs 
GTV Network HD was launched in 2018, and has following program/talk show:
 Mad e Muqabil with Rauf Klasra & Amir Mateen (Monday to Thursday 10 PM) 
 Live with Mujahid (Monday to Thursday 7 PM)
 RedZone (Friday To Sunday 10 PM)
 G Sports (Monday To Thursday 11 PM)
 G Aya Nu  (Saturday 11 PM )
 Alif Laam Meem (Monday to Friday 5 PM)
 Inside Financial Markets (Saturday 2 PM)
 G Ka Jahan (Friday 11 PM)
 Wild Pets (Sunday 5 PM)

References

External links 
 Official website English 
 Official Urdu Website

Television channels and stations established in 2018
Television stations in Karachi
Television networks in Pakistan
Television stations in Pakistan
2018 establishments in Pakistan